St. Ann's Episcopal Church is a historic church at 419 Woodland Street in Nashville, Tennessee. It was originally built in 1882 and added to the National Register of Historic Places in 1983. The historic sanctuary was destroyed by a tornado in April, 1998. The church was rebuilt on the same location later that year.

References

Churches completed in 1882
19th-century Episcopal church buildings
Episcopal churches in Tennessee
Churches on the National Register of Historic Places in Tennessee
Gothic Revival church buildings in Tennessee
Churches in Nashville, Tennessee
National Register of Historic Places in Nashville, Tennessee
1882 establishments in Tennessee